Helenium brevifolium is a North American perennial plant in the sunflower family, commonly known as shortleaf sneezeweed. It is native to the southeastern United States, from Virginia to eastern Louisiana and inland as far as Tennessee.

Helenium brevifolium is an perennial herb up to 100 cm (40 inches) tall. One plant can produce as many as 10 flower heads, in branching arrays. The head is spherical or hemispherical, with sometimes as many as 800 disc florets, each floret yellow near the base but purple or brown or yellow towards the tip. There are also 9-24 yellow ray florets. The species grows in bogs, swamps, and other wet places.

References

External links
Helenium brevifolium - Louisiana Department of Wildlife and Fisheries  description, photos, line drawing, ecological information, Louisiana distribution map
Southeastern Flora photos
Digital Atlas of the Virginia Flora
Atlas of Florida Vascular Plants

Flora of the Southeastern United States
Plants described in 1841
brevifolium
Flora without expected TNC conservation status